is a 2003 anime film, the seventh based on the Case Closed series, directed by Kenji Kodama.

It was the first film in full-length traditional digital paint. Studio A-CAT did the 3D graphics. The film was released on 19 April 2003 and grossed ¥3.2 billion.

Features 
His rival, Heiji Hattori, plays an active role from the main character, Conan Edogawa, and his special skill is a fierce sword action centered on kendo, and a bike action that uses both hand-painting by an animator and 3DCG. In addition, Heiji is in charge of a part of the work commentary, and his childhood friend Kazuha Toyama also appears. In addition, these two people have appeared in the film version for the second time since the third film The Last Wizard of the Century, and Miwako Sato has also appeared for the second time since the fourth film Captured in Her Eyes.

Plot
Heiji Hattori searches for a girl he fell in love with after he saw her playing outside a temple when he was little. Meanwhile, Kogoro, Ran, Conan, and Sonoko go to Kyoto and meet up with Heiji and Kazuha to investigate a robbery and several murders. The killer tries to kill Heiji several times and severely injures Heiji. The killer kidnaps Kazuha, but Heiji collapses before he can reach her. Conan swallows a pill Haibara gave him and a bottle of wine, temporarily turning him back into Shinichi. He disguises himself as Heiji and attempts to arrest the killer and save Kazuha and manages to stall the murderer until Heiji arrives. Using kendo, Heiji fights the culprit while Shinichi runs into the woods to hide while his transformation into Conan occurs. In the woods, Shinichi bumps into Ran and stuns Ran with his tranquilizer watch to prevent her from seeing his transformation into Conan. Conan then reaches Heiji and Kazuha in time to save them by kicking sticks of fire at the culprit. The culprit continues to fight Heiji and manages to push the Osaka detective to the edge of the roof. Conan kicks a soccer ball at the enemy, giving Heiji time to regain his footing. In the end, Heiji finds out that the girl from his childhood was Kazuha and does not tell Kazuha that she is the girl he was looking for.

Cast
Minami Takayama as Conan Edogawa
Wakana Yamazaki as Ran Mori
Akira Kamiya as Kogoro Mori
Kappei Yamaguchi as Shinichi Kudo
Chafurin as Inspector Megure
Atsuko Yuya as Officer Sato
Kazuhiko Inoue as Officer Shiratori
Ikue Ohtani as Mitsuhiko Tsuburaya
Megumi Hayashibara as Ai Haibara
Naoko Matsui as Sonoko Suzuki
Wataru Takagi as Genta Kojima and Officer Takagi
Yukiko Iwai as Ayumi Yoshida
Ryo Horikawa as Heiji Hattori
Yuko Miyamura as Kazuha Toyama

Staff
Original creator: Gosho Aoyama
Screenplay: Kazunari Kouchi
Music: Katsuo Ono
Character design and chief animation director: Masatomo Sudo
Art director: Yukihiro Shibutani
Director of photography: Takashi Nomura
Sound director: Yasuo Uragami
Sound effects: Masakazu Yokoyama
Sound production: Audio Planning U
Producers: Masahito Yoshioka, Michihiko Suwa
Animation production: TMS Entertainment
Assistant director: Akira Nishimori
Director: Kenji Kodama

Music
It was released on March 5, 2003. Crossroad in the Ancient Capital is the second Case Closed film for which Mai Kuraki wrote the theme song, after Countdown to Heaven.

The official soundtrack was released on April 16, 2003. It costs ¥3059 including tax.

Reception 
In the popularity poll of 19 successive films held in 2016, this film won the first place.

Home media

DVD
The DVD was released on December 17, 2003. It contains the film and the trailer and costs ¥6090 including tax.

Blu-ray
The Blu-ray version of the film was released on December 24, 2010. The Blu-ray contains the same content as the DVD plus a mini-booklet explaining the film.

Manga
A manga adaptation based on the film, was released in September 2016 until April 2017.

References

External links
 
Official TMS website  
Official TMS website 

2003 anime films
TMS Entertainment
Toho animated films
Films set in Kyoto
Crossroad in the Ancient Capital
Films directed by Kenji Kodama